(Deliver me), WAB 21, is the first of two settings of the absoute Libera me, composed by Anton Bruckner in .

History 
Bruckner composed the motet during his stay in Kronstorf. The work was presumably performed at that time.

The original manuscript is lost, but there are two good copies, one made by Max Auer (Kronstorf, 1903). The motet was first published in band I, pp. 243–248 of the Göllerich/Auer biography.

Music 
The work is scored in F major for mixed choir and organ. In this youth work, two parts of the responsory are not included: the second "Quando caeli movendi sunt et terra" and the second "Dum veneris iudicare saeculum per ignem".

Discography 
There are a few recordings of this first setting of Libera me:
 Joseph Pancik, Prager Kammerchor, Anton Bruckner: Motetten / Choral-Messe  – CD: Orfeo C 327 951 A, 1993 - transcription a cappella with repeat of the first verse
 Dan-Olof Stenlund, Malmö Kammarkör, Bruckner: Ausgewählte Werke – CD: Malmö Kammarkör MKKCD 051, 2004
 Thomas Kerbl, Chorvereinigung Bruckner 09, Anton Bruckner: Chöre/Klaviermusik – CD: LIVA 034, 2009
 Łukasz Borowicz, Anton Bruckner: Requiem, RIAS Kammerchor Berlin, Akademie für Alte Musik Berlin – CD: Accentus ACC30474, 2019 - Cohrs edition with revised organ accompaniment and repeat of the first verse
 Sigvards Klava, Latvian Radio Choir, Bruckner: Latin Motets, 2019 – CD Ondine OD 1362
 Christian Erny, The Zurich Chamber Singers, Bruckner Spectrum - CD: Berlin Classics LC06203, 2022

References

Sources 
 August Göllerich, Anton Bruckner. Ein Lebens- und Schaffens-Bild,  – posthumous edited by Max Auer by G. Bosse, Regensburg, 1932
 Anton Bruckner – Sämtliche Werke, Band XXI: Kleine Kirchenmusikwerke, Musikwissenschaftlicher Verlag der Internationalen Bruckner-Gesellschaft, Hans Bauernfeind and Leopold Nowak (Editor), Vienna, 1984/2001
 Cornelis van Zwol, Anton Bruckner 1824–1896 – Leven en werken, uitg. Thoth, Bussum, Netherlands, 2012. 
 Uwe Harten, Anton Bruckner. Ein Handbuch. Residenz Verlag, Salzburg, 1996. .

External links 
 
  
 Libera me F-Dur, WAB 21 Critical discography by Hans Roelofs 

Motets by Anton Bruckner
1843 compositions
Compositions in F major